Alo is an Estonian-language male given name.

People named Alo include:
 Alo Bärengrub (born 1984), Estonian footballer
 Alo Dupikov (born 1985), Estonian footballer
 Alo Jakin (born 1986), Estonian acyclist
 Alo Kelly (born 1977), Irish professional boxer
 Alo Kõrve (born 1978), Estonian actor
 Alo Libang (born 1964), Indian politician
 Alo Mattiisen (1961–1996), Estonian composer
 Alo Sila, American football player
 Alo Suurna (1913–2008), Estonian basketball and volleyball player
 Alo Toom (born 1986), Estonian wrestler

References

Estonian masculine given names